Yvonne Rand was a "lay householder" Soto Zen priest and guiding teacher of Goat-in-the-Road located in Anderson Valley, Mendocino County, California, a meditation center which practices predominantly Soto Zen but also incorporates elements of Theravada and Vajrayana Buddhism.

Pioneering Buddhist studies and communities 
Yvonne Rand took an interest in eastern religions at a young age, and began to study the teachings of Buddhism in 1954. She began practicing with Shunryu Suzuki in 1966, served as his secretary and personal assistant, and—together with his wife Mitsu Suzuki—cared for him through his illness and death in 1971.

She was a founder of the San Francisco Zen Center, was ordained as a priest, served on the board of directors, and continued to practice and teach there for many years, primarily at Green Gulch Zen Center. Yvonne had been "Zen Center secretary in the '60s, President in the '70s, and Chair of the Board in the '80s."

She studied with Dainin Katagiri, and received dharma transmission from him in 1989. Her interests led her to study with other notable teachers in many Buddhist traditions, including Rinzai Zen roshis Maureen Stuart and Shodo Harada; Theravadan Buddhism, with Henepola Gunaratana and her friend Ajahn Sumedho; and the Tibetan Buddhist tradition with the Dalai Lama and Tara Tulku Rinpoche. Rand's extensive work with Tara Tulku Rinpoche led to her active support of the Tibetan Buddhist community in diaspora and to a recognition of the deep connections between Vajrayana and Soto Zen insights and practices.

For many years Rand led meditation retreats at Redwood Creek Dharma Center, which was located on Mount Tamalpais in Northern California. Deeply interested in ecology and environmentalism, according to Rand, "[f]or a number of years a small group of us went out for a weekend once a month, year-round, criss-crossing the coast range from San Francisco to the Oregon border, studying plants and geology and all manner of things having to do with where we live." The Redwood Creek Dharma Center was filled with gardens of various plants and flowers, and was also home to much wildlife.

"Lay householder" Buddhist teaching 
She described herself as a lay householder priest, to emphasize the importance of the world of family and daily life in dharma practice. Throughout her career, she taught widely throughout the United States, in lectures, workshops, conferences, and retreats.

She established the Goat-in-the-Road Buddhist practice center (also known as Bodaiji, Buddha Mind Temple) in Marin County with a focus on Zen, and taught there for many years. The name "Goat-in-the-Road" recalls Yvonne's sense of humor, her early rescue of young goats from a local Spring barbecue auction, and the goats' tendencies to escape onto Highway 1 in Muir Beach."

In 2005 she moved Goat-in-the-Road to Philo, in Mendocino County, where she continued to lead retreats.

Rand was instrumental in developing a ceremony of remembrance in the West, called the Jizo Ceremony (after a Japanese bodhisattva) for children, born and unborn, who have died. This ceremony is continuing as part of her Dharma legacy, as numerous other Buddhist teachers have taken it up. Her understanding of the inseparability of life and death led her to sit with and tend people in end-of-life care over many decades, with the same attentiveness she brought to all her encounters. She also taught and counseled extensively both professional and volunteer caregivers working with the terminally ill.

Rand "brings a pro-choice, anti-abortion Buddhist perspective to reproductive issues by defending a woman's right to choose while teaching that abortion's moral gravity makes it at best an option of last resort."

Other interests 
An avid gardener, she brought plants, animals, clouds and water into her teachings. Her creative explorations were wide-ranging, rooted in her long training in weaving and ceramics.

Beginning in 1970, she studied with Harry Kellett Roberts, a widely recognized California native plant specialist trained in the Native American tradition of the Yurok People.

An environmental activist and leader, she served on the early board of The Trust for Public Land from 1974 to 1984, the last five years as board chair, working closely with environmentalist Huey Johnson, the Trust’s founder.

She studied Noh theater chanting and tea ceremony with Yaeko Nakamura Sensei. She formed and studied of an extensive collection of Tibetan Buddhist art. She was centrally involved in a research program called AWAKE: Art, Buddhism, and the Dimensions of Consciousness.

Personal life 
Yvonne grew up in California and graduated from Stanford University in 1957.

She was married for four decades to William Wallace Sterling, who predeceased her by nine months. An earlier marriage to Kendrick Rand, father of her two children, ended in divorce in 1968. Yvonne leaves two children, Christopher and Hilary Rand.

Illness and death 
In her last years, she became ill with Alzheimer’s disease. She was open about her progressive condition and was able to continue teaching; not despite the illness, but taking it into account. As her losses became more apparent, a student noted that she had never witnessed Rand reacting with frustration or self-criticism to her diminishing capabilities. When asked about this, even with advanced Alzheimer’s, Rand observed with clarity, “I am in the moment as it arises.”

The day before she died, she said, “No form – we just say thank you.”

See also
Buddhism in the United States
Timeline of Zen Buddhism in the United States

Notes

References

External links
Yvonne Rand Cuke page

San Francisco Zen Center
Soto Zen Buddhists
Zen Buddhist priests
American Zen Buddhists
Living people
Women Buddhist priests
People from Mendocino County, California
1935 births